The 2016 Women's Baseball World Cup was the 7th edition of the WBSC Women's Baseball World Cup, the biennial international women's baseball world championship tournament. The competition was held in Gijang, South Korea from September 3 to September 11, 2016.

Teams 

For 2016, the number of qualifying teams grew from eight for its 6th edition in 2014 to twelve teams.

The following 12 teams qualified for the tournament.

Round 1

The matches were played from September 3 to 5. The top two teams from each group advanced to the next round.

Group A

Group B

Group C

Round 2

The matches were played from September 7 to 10.  The head to head results of Opening Round games between two nations that advanced to the Super Round carried over and counted to establish four qualified nations for the Final Round as well as overall competition standings. The same methodology applied to the consolation round. The top two teams from the Super Round will qualify for the World Championship Final and the 3rd and 4th placed teams in the Super Round will play for the Bronze Medal Game.

Super Round

Consolation round

Round 3

Bronze Medal

Gold Medal

Final standings

Rosters
Canada

 Melissa Armstrong (P)
 Amanda Asay (P)
 Veronika Boyd (OF)
 Claire Eccles (P)
 Jenna Flannigan (OF)
 Daphnée Gélinas (IF)
 Jennifer Gilroy (C)
 Katie Hagen (P)
 Rebecca Hartley (OF)
 Heather Healey (P)
 Pascale Jalbert (IF)
 Kelsey Lalor (OF)
 Anne-Sophie Lavallée (P)
 Nicole Luchanski (IF)
 Daniella Matteucci (P)
 Autumn Mills (P)
 Heidi Northcott (P)
 Kate Psota (IF)
 Ashley Stephenson (IF)
 Mia Valcke (OF)

Manager: Andre Lachance

Japan

 Mirai Araki (P)
 Yurika Arisaka (C)
 Miki Atsugase (IF)
 Chihiro Funakoshi (C)
 Airi Hiraga (IF)
 Yukiko Ishida (IF)
 Yukiko Kawabata (IF)
 Yaya Kojima (IF)
 Yukiko Kon (IF)
 Iori Miura (OF)
 Remina Nagaike (OF)
 Ayako Rokkaku (IF)
 Nana Sasanuma (P)
 Ayami Sato (P)
 Miyu Shimizu (P)
 Akiko Shimura (OF)
 Mana Taguchi (IF)
 Akino Tanaka (P)
 Ayumi Terabe (C)
 Moemi Yoshii (P)

Manager: Koichi Okura

References

External links 
 Official site

Women's Baseball World Cup
2010s in women's baseball
2016 in baseball
Women's Baseball World Cup, 2016
2016
Gijang County
Women's Baseball World Cup